Baker Lake (Inuinnaqtun: Qamanittuaq) is a territorial electoral district (riding) for the Legislative Assembly of Nunavut, Canada. The riding consists of the community of Baker Lake. The current Member of the Legislative Assembly is Simeon Mikkungwak.

The Nunavut Electoral Boundaries Commission has recommended the district be renamed Qamani'tuaq, after the Inuktitut name of the community, for the next election, along with minor boundary changes. However, the name appears to have not been changed.

Election results

1999 election

2004 election

2008 election

2013 election

2017 election

2020 by-election

References

External links
Website of the Legislative Assembly of Nunavut

Electoral districts of Kivalliq Region
1999 establishments in Nunavut